Vârful Păpuşa (Păpuşa peak) is a  mountain in the Parâng Mountains of Romania, part of the Parâng Mountains group.

Mountains
 Parâng Mountains (Munţii Parâng)
 Şureanu Mountains (Munţii Şureanu/M. Sebeşului)
 Cindrel Mountains (Munţii Cindrel/M. Cibinului)
 Lotru Mountains (Munţii Lotrului; literally: Mountains of the Thief)
 Căpăţâna Mountains (Munţii Căpăţânii; literally: Mountains of the Head or Mountains of the Skull)

See also
 Carpathian Mountains
 Retezat-Godeanu Mountains group
 Făgăraş Mountains group
 Transalpina Road
 Rânca

External links
 Muntii Carpati - Fotografii, Cabane, Harti, Trasee, Salvamont, Cantece online, Vremea la munte
 Astazi la Alpinet - Alpinet.org :: Ghidul tau montan : Cazare : Trasee : etc.

Mountains of Romania
Mountains of the Southern Carpathians